A River Somewhere is an Australian documentary television series originally broadcast by ABC TV in 1997 and 1998. It was produced by Working Dog Productions, and was hosted by Tom Gleisner and Rob Sitch. The series was released on DVD in 2005.

The series focused on the observations of Sitch and Gleisner as they travelled to various locations across Australia, New Zealand and around the world to fly fish and experience the local culture. The aim of their expedition was to "catch dinner and have it cooked in a local style".

The music used throughout the series was created by Australian musician and composer Liam Bradley.

Places visited in the series
 Howqua River, Victoria – 25 June 1997
 Cotswolds, England and Altnaharra, Scotland – 2 July 1997
 D'Urville River, New Zealand – 9 July 1997
 Chamberlain River, Western Australia – 16 July 1997
 Los Roques Archipelago, Venezuela – 23 July 1997
 Courmayeur, Italy – 30 July 1997
 Valle D’Aosta, Italy
 Cobungra River, Victoria
 Wyoming, United States of America
 Yarraki (Olive) River, Queensland
 Tongariro River, New Zealand
 Turneffe Islands, Belize
 Calcutta, India and Bhutan

References

External links
Australian Television Information Archive: A River Somewhere
 

Some episodes are available on the YouTube channel of Butch Ammons.

Australian Broadcasting Corporation original programming
1990s Australian documentary television series
Fly fishing